Lorena is a 2019 American true-crime docuseries about the 1993 assault and subsequent court case involving John and Lorena Bobbitt. The four-part series premiered on February 15, 2019 on Amazon Prime Video. It was directed by Joshua Rofé who also served as an executive producer alongside Jordan Peele, Win Rosenfeld, Steven J. Berger, Jenna Santoianni, and Tom Lesinski.

Premise
On June 23, 1993, Lorena Bobbitt cut off her husband John Bobbitt’s penis with an eight-inch carving knife from the kitchen counter while he was asleep in bed. She left the apartment with the severed appendage and drove her car to the nail salon where she worked. She threw the penis out of the car window into a roadside field during her commute. It was later found and re-attached. After her arrest, Lorena accused John of ongoing domestic violence and marital rape. The story and trial became a headline worldwide due to the 24-hour news cycle.

Lorena features interviews with both Lorena and John as they detail the events leading up to the night of the incident, the trial and aftermath in their personal lives. It is described by Amazon as "a groundbreaking re-investigation of the deep moral issues and painful human tragedies buried at the heart of this infamous American scandal. Lost in the tabloid coverage and jokes was the opportunity for a national discussion on domestic and sexual assault in America."

Production
On April 5, 2018, it was announced that Amazon Prime Video had given the production a series order consisting of four episodes. The series was set to be directed by Joshua Rofé who was also expected to executive produce alongside Jordan Peele, Win Rosenfeld, Steven J. Berger, Jenna Santoianni, and Tom Lesinski. Production companies involved with the series were slated to consist of Monkeypaw Productions, Sonar Entertainment, and Number 19. On January 8, 2019, it was announced that the series would premiere on February 15, 2019.

Release
On January 8, 2019, the first trailer for the series was released.

The series held its official premiere on January 29, 2019, during the 2019 Sundance Film Festival as a part of the festival's Special Events section of screenings.

Episodes

Reception
On review aggregator Rotten Tomatoes, it holds an approval rating of 82% based on 45 reviews, with an average rating of 7.33/10. The website's critical consensus reads, "Fascinating and frustrating, Lorena ample footage and fresh perspective on a long-mocked moment provide welcome context and vindication to the woman at its center — even if its reenactments don't quite measure up." Metacritic, which uses a weighted average, assigned the series a score of 75 out of 100 based on 18 critics, indicating "generally favorable reviews".

References

External links
 

2019 American television series debuts
2010s American documentary television series
English-language television shows
True crime television series
Amazon Prime Video original programming